The black-faced cotinga (Conioptilon mcilhennyi) is a species of bird in the family Cotingidae. It is the only member of the genus Conioptilon.

It is mainly found in the Amazon Basin of eastern Peru as well as in adjacent border areas of western Brazil and northwestern Bolivia.
Its natural habitat is subtropical or tropical moist lowland forests.

Geographic distribution
They are found in the Madre de Dios and Balta in South Ucayali, the Caimisea river, Cuzco, and the Tejo and Juruá Rivers in western Brazil.

References

black-faced cotinga
Birds of the Peruvian Amazon
black-faced cotinga
Taxonomy articles created by Polbot